Candidapepsin (Candida albicans aspartic proteinase, Candida albicans carboxyl proteinase, Candida albicans secretory acid proteinase, Candida olea acid proteinase, Candida aspartic proteinase, Candida olea aspartic proteinase) is an enzyme. This enzyme catalyses the following chemical reaction

 Preferential cleavage at the carboxyl of hydrophobic amino acids, but fails to cleave Leu15-Tyr, Tyr16-Leu and Phe24-Phe of insulin B chain. Activates trypsinogen, and degrades keratin

This endopeptidase is present in yeast Candida albicans.

References

External links 
 

EC 3.4.23